The 2011 Winton 300 was a motor race for the Australian sedan-based V8 Supercars racing cars. It was the fifth event of the 2011 International V8 Supercars Championship. It was held on the weekend of May 20 to 22 at the Winton Motor Raceway near Benalla, Victoria.

The event hosted races 10 and 11 of the 2011 season. A 40 lap, 120-kilometre race was held on Saturday while a 67 lap, 200-kilometre race was held on Sunday. Both races were preceded by a 20-minute qualifying session to decide the grid.

Jamie Whincup continued his strong start to the season with a win and a second place. Jason Bright took his second win in as many events by taking out the second race. Steven Johnson recorded his first podium finish for the year, only narrowly beaten to second place in the Saturday race by Lee Holdsworth. Whincup increased his championship lead to 262 points.

Standings
 After 11 of 28 races.

References

Skycity Triple Crown